Windesheim is a municipality in the district of Bad Kreuznach in Rhineland-Palatinate, in western Germany.

References

External links
The KKM Big Band Windesheim

Bad Kreuznach (district)